Apartheid Is Nazism is an album by the Ivorian musician Alpha Blondy. The title track was a hit; the album, as an import, was a success in the United States prior to its Shanachie release. Blondy supported the album with a North American tour.

Production
The album was recorded in Abidjan. Blondy was backed by members of the Solar System Band, his touring group. Blondy sang in French, Arabic, English, African patois, and Hebrew, among other languages. He used salsa horns on "Apartheid is Nazism".

Critical reception

Spin wrote that Blondy "creates an arresting pop-music montage by blending bits of traditional West African rhythms and call-and-response singing." Robert Christgau opined that, "as usual in West African pop, the voice is too mild, and as usual in West African reggae, the rhythm section is too buoyant," but acknowledged that "the singing completes an eloquently transatlantic groove." The Toronto Star deemed the album "powerful, provocative protest music with a rock-steady heart."

The Los Angeles Times noted that "there's a certain lack of snap that leaves the album more competent than truly gripping." The New York Times praised Blondy's willingness "to reveal convictions." The Gazette called the album "superb," writing that the title track is "as eloquent and angry as Marley at his best."

Track listing

Personnel
Alpha Blondy – lead vocals

References

Alpha Blondy albums
1985 albums
EMI Records albums
Shanachie Records albums